Buon sangue is the tenth studio album by Italian singer-songwriter Jovanotti.
It was followed up by a live DVD of the album's songs. In Italy the album is 4× platinum with 290,000+ copies sold.

Tracks
"(Tanto)³" – 3:33
"Mi fido di te" – 4:33
"Per me" – 4:19
"Falla girare" (featuring Planet Funk) – 4:32
"Un buco nella tasca" – 3:46
"Mani in alto" – 4:06
"Penelope" – 4:11
"Una storia d'amore" – 4:08
"La valigia" – 4:22
"La voglia di libertà" – 4:22
"Coraggio" – 4:20
"Bruto" – 4:27	
"Mi disordino" – 12:14
"Buon sangue" (hidden track)

Hidden title song
A song probably titled "Buon sangue" starts at 5:02 in "Mi disordino".

External links
 Official Song Lyrics

2005 albums
Jovanotti albums
Italian-language albums
Universal Music Italy albums
Albums produced by Michele Canova